The 2008 U.S. Virgin Islands Republican territorial meeting, also known as the Republican caucuses, took place on the U.S. Virgin Islands of St. Croix and St. Thomas on April 5, 2008.  Virgin Islands Republicans could select six pledged delegates for the 2008 Republican National Convention; three party leaders also attended the convention as unpledged delegates.  However, the delegates chosen in the meeting did not support any presidential candidate, so all nine Virgin Islands delegates attended the convention as unpledged delegates.

The turnout, around 150 people, did not match the comparatively staggering number of voters in the Democratic Territorial Meeting, but it was still a record turnout for the Virgin Islands Republican Party.  Caucus-goers voted for delegates rather than candidates.  Of 25 people who sought delegate spots, the majority, 16, were not committed to any presidential candidate.

Results

Delegates

Chosen by voters 
Warren Cole, St. Croix District, uncommitted
Krim Ballentine, St. Thomas-St. John District, uncommitted
V. Anne Golden, St. Croix District, uncommitted
Patricia Murphy, St. Thomas-St. John District, uncommitted
April Newland, St. Thomas-St. John District, uncommitted
Humberto O'Neal, Saint Croix District, uncommitted

Chosen by party 
Lilliana Belardo O'Neal, Republican National Committeewoman
Holland Redfield, Republican National Committeeman
Herb Schoenbohm, Republican State Chairman

See also 

 Republican Party (United States) presidential primaries, 2008
 United States Virgin Islands Democratic primary, 2008

References 

Virgin Islands
Republican caucuses
United States Virgin Islands Republican caucuses